Li Chun (September 12, 1867 – October 12, 1920) was a Chinese general of the Warlord Era of the Republic of China.

Biography 

During the 1911 Xinhai Revolution, he was part of the First Army, which fought against the revolutionaries of the Wuchang Uprising, commanding the 11th Brigade of the Beiyang Army's 6th Division. Li was promoted to command of the 6th Division after the previous commander, Wu Luzhen, was made acting governor of Shanxi.

References

Citations

Sources 
 

1867 births
1920 deaths
Qing dynasty military personnel
Republic of China warlords from Tianjin
Empire of China (1915–1916)